Kaliyuga Varadaraja Perumal Temple or Kaliyaperumal temple is a Hindu temple located at Kallankurichi in the Ariyalur district of Tamil Nadu, India. This temple is at distance of 10 km from Ariyalur. It is dedicated to Perumal (Vishnu).

Significance 
The temple is about 250 years old and built by a cowherd on  the spot of a 12-feet high post believed to have miraculous powers. The post now forms the main deity in the temple. Close by is the idol of Hanuman.

Presiding deity
There is no idol found as a presiding deity. Only a 12 feet tall post, a granite pillar, is found. Pujas are performed to this post. The temple has a majestic front with a few carvings. The Pillar of power is the presiding deity of the temple.  The granite pillar is referred as 'Kambamperumal'. On the lower portion of the pillar Hanuman is carved out. It is a tiny figure. It appears to be in a state of firm self-control walks forward with the Sanjeevi hill on his left hand while the right hand is raised in a token of assurance. While going around the pillar within the sanctum, two carved figures, who found the temple 250 years back, can be seen. The processional deity, Varadharaja perumal can be worshipped in a large niche within the temple. Sreedevi and Boodevi are found in the temple. This temple is also known as Kaliyuga Varadaraja Perumal Temple.

Offerings
The peasants bring portion of their promised offering here and pour them in the assigned vats. They are then measured and tied up in bags and placed in the rooms above, to be taken out and used later. There are large granaries. The devotees tie to the neck of a goat a note with the words 'Kaliyaperumal Kovil' and it would not get lost. Those who come across it will direct to move towards the temple of Kaliyaperumal near Ariyalur.

Festival
Rama Navami is celebrated in a grand manner in this temple. During the car festival devotees come in large number and participate.

References 

Hindu temples in Ariyalur district
Vishnu temples